The State Civil Aviation Agency of the Republic of Azerbaijan is a governmental agency within the Cabinet of Azerbaijan in charge of regulating activities in the sphere of civil aviation in Republic of Azerbaijan.

History
The State Civil Aviation Administration was established by the Presidential Decree No. 512 on  December 29, 2006 with the purpose of regulation and improvement of civil aviation on the territory of Azerbaijan and development of cooperation with international aviation.

Within the framework of presidential decree dated January 12, 2018, the State Civil Aviation Administration has been transferred to the Ministry as State Civil Aviation Agency under the Ministry of Transport, Communications and High Technologies of Azerbaijan.

The State Civil Aviation Agency which is guided by the Statute determined by its relevant department, Azerbaijani Constitution, presidential decrees and orders, as well as the resolutions and decrees of the Ministers` Cabinet of Azerbaijan, international civil aviation organizations` requirements, legal acts of Azerbaijan's Transport, Communications and High Technologies Ministry, exercises state control and civil aviation regulation.

The Agency operates in cooperation with other relevant administrations, self-governing bodies, non-governmental and foreign organizations, as well as with legal entities. The Agency's activity has been organized on its own independent balance. It has state-owned property, a seal with the State Emblem of Azerbaijan and stamps, and blanks in the Azerbaijani and English languages. The agency manages its budget through its bank accounts.

Employees of the Agency should wear special uniforms. The state budget and some sources fund the material and technical base of the Agency. The costs of the State Civil Aviation Agency are also financed by the state budget.

Structure
The agency is headed by its director and two deputy directors. The staff of the administration is limited to 49 employees. It consists of Flight Safety Oversight, Aviation Security, Licensing and State Registry, Foreign Relations and Financial and Economic departments. The Office of the Higher Attestation Commission and Commission for Certification and Licensing of Subjects of Civil Aviation are subordinated to the agency.

Functions 
Main functions of the Civil Aviation Administration are controlling safety of civil aircraft operations; security and environmental protection from emissions caused by civil aircraft; conducting regulatory functions in the field of aviation; engaging in cooperation with international civil aviation organizations, and aeronautical authorities of other countries; conducting mandatory certification of all civil aviation entities in Azerbaijan in accordance with state and international requirements; issuing permits to civil aircraft of foreign countries for both scheduled and chartered operations on the territory of the Republic of Azerbaijan; performing inspections of civil aviation entities; developing competitive air transportation market; conducting investigations of civil aviation accidents; making recommendations to the Cabinet of Ministers of Azerbaijan on building, opening or closing airports and air traffic facilities in the country. The agency also conducts work in preventing illegal operations in air transportation on the territory of Azerbaijan such as building of an airport in Shusha. It is a member of European Civil Aviation Conference

Rights of the agency 

 To prepare legislation relating to the relevant field;
 To make proposals to the Ministry on the support of international agreements in the relevant field;
 To require necessary information (documents) from government agencies and local self-governing bodies, individuals and legal entities;
 To cooperate with relevant foreign executive bodies and international organizations, to study their experience; carry out analyze and make proposals in the relevant field;
 To involve independent experts and specialists; release special bulletins and other publications; to make proposals for the establishment, annulment and reorganization of the structures to regulate the activities of the relevant sector;
 Free access to all documents (information) on the activities of inspectors, aircraft, service rooms, technical means, civil aviation activities, civil aviation officials to issue relevant instructions and inspections in matters of flight and aviation safety, as well as the terms of their execution;
 Conduction of conferences and seminars on improvement of civil aviation activities and development problems, organizing exhibitions; draft relevant legislative acts and field standards that define the general rules of civil aviation, make proposals on making changes to the applicable legislation, if necessary;
  Apply to the Ministry for proposals to make amendments and additions to the ICAO Standards and Recommended Practices;
 To make suggestions on the development of the Agency's official symbols and distinctive marks;
 To make proposals on the approval of the rules of transportation of clothing samples, distinctive signs and uniforms in civil aviation;
 Attracting scientific organizations, companies, individual professionals including foreign experts, on a contractual basis to resolve issues that concern the Agency's authorities.

See also

Cabinet of Azerbaijan
List of airports in Azerbaijan
Azerbaijan Airlines

References

External links
State Civil Aviation Administration
State Civil Aviation Administration 
Flight Information Region In Azerbaijan

Government agencies of Azerbaijan
Government agencies established in 2006
2006 establishments in Azerbaijan
Civil aviation in Azerbaijan